Odem is a city in San Patricio County, Texas, United States. Its population was 2,389 at the 2010 census.

History
The city was platted in 1909 by John James Welder and David Odem. It was named for Odem, who was the county sheriff.

Geography

Odem is located at  (27.947773, –97.584169).

According to the United States Census Bureau, the city has a total area of 1.1  sq mi (2.9 km), all of it land.

Demographics

2020 census

As of the 2020 United States census, there were 2,255 people, 765 households, and 542 families residing in the city.

2000 census
As of the census of 2000, 2,499 people, 776 households, and 633 families were residing in the city. The population density was 2,246.0 people/sq mi (869.3/km). The 843 housing units averaged 757.7/sq mi (293.2/km). The racial makeup of the city was 73.59% White, 0.20% African American, 0.68% Native American,  23.11% from other races, and 2.44% from two or more races. Hispanics or Latinos of any race were 77.91% of the population.

Of the 776 households,  43.9% had children under 18 living with them, 58.9% were married couples living together, 17.5% had a female householder with no husband present, and 18.3% were not families. About 17.4% of all households were made up of individuals, and 9.1% had someone living alone who was 65 or older. The average household size was 3.22, and the average family size was 3.65.

In the city, the age distribution was 32.5% under 18, 9.9% from 18 to 24, 26.8% from 25 to 44, 20.3% from 45 to 64, and 10.5% who were 65 or older. The median age was 31 years. For every 100 females, there were 87.2 males. For every 100 females age 18 and over, there were 82.5 males.

The median income for a household in the city was $31,090, and for a family was $33,947. Males had a median income of $26,875 versus $19,063 for females. The per capita income for the city was $11,246. About 18.2% of families and 19.4% of the population were below the poverty line, including 21.5% of those under age 18 and 22.9% of those age 65 or over.

Education
The City of Odem is served by the Odem-Edroy Independent School District.

References

Cities in Texas
Cities in San Patricio County, Texas
Cities in the Corpus Christi metropolitan area